Established in 1975, the School of Continuing Education (SCE) is one of the faculties of the Hong Kong Baptist University (HKBU), offers full-time and part-time programmes through its College of International Education, Continuing and Professional Education Division as well as Early Childhood and Elementary Education Division.

In addition to HKBU's postgraduate, undergraduate, associate degree, higher diploma, diploma and certificate programmes, the School also collaborates with overseas universities to offer programmes which lead to a non-local award. To support teaching and research in early childhood education, the School runs the HKBU Kindergarten, the first university-affiliated kindergarten in Hong Kong.

On a self-financed basis, the School operates at two University campuses in Kowloon Tong and Shek Mun as well as three learning centres located along the Mass Transit Railway lines.

Campus Learning Centres:
 Kowloon Tong Campus Centre
 DLB Office
 SCE Tower Office
 Shek Mun (Shatin) Campus Centre
Kowloon Learning Centres:
  Tsimshatsui Centre
  Kowloon East Centre
Hong Kong Learning Centre:
 Wan Chai Centre

Hong Kong Baptist University